Kustugulovo (Köstöğol) is a rural locality (a village) in Karlamansky Selsoviet, Karmaskalinsky District, Bashkortostan, Russia. The population was 171 as of 2010. There are 2 streets.

Geography 
Kustugulovo is located 24 km east of Karmaskaly (the district's administrative centre) by road. Sakharozavodskaya is the nearest rural locality.

References 

Rural localities in Karmaskalinsky District